September 2022 Kabul bombing may refer to:
September 2022 Kabul mosque bombing
September 2022 Kabul school bombing